"Show Don't Tell" is the first single on Canadian rock band Rush's 1989 album Presto. The song peaked at number one on the U.S. Hot Mainstream Rock Tracks Chart, the second of five songs by Rush to top the chart.

Music and song structure
"Show Don't Tell" illustrates Rush's move away from synthesizer in favour of a more guitar-oriented approach; the band favoured a more funk/groove style of play and away from the 1980s style of music typical on Power Windows and Hold Your Fire, the two preceding albums.  In Rush's music of the late 1970s and early 1980s, their progressive rock is indicated by asymmetric time signatures and lyrics fitting into a concept album, and in "Show Don't Tell", their progressive rock is shown by using a very complex riff played in unison by the members of the band.
The band chose to use more funk by using extended chord tones, a dramatic pause eighteen seconds into the song and other methods as well.

The funkier song structure proved to be difficult for Neil Peart when he played the drums for the song.  He explained in Canadian Musician:

Lyrics
As is the case with a vast majority of Rush songs, Peart wrote the lyrics for this song.  In an interview, he explained that "Show Don't Tell" is an example of his trend from the album Grace Under Pressure onward from writing concepts and abstractions to a more concrete, first-person viewpoint, or as he noted when interviewed a perspective with a "stance and a good attitude".
Peart alternates between narration and a first person perspective as he writes about confronting a person who has fooled the protagonist of the song too often.  Peart's philosophy throughout the song is epitomized with the very no-nonsense lyric "You can twist perception.  Reality won't budge!"  The first verse explains the frustration of depending on others and finding out that is the wrong approach (e.g. "Everyone knows everything, and no one's ever wrong, until later.  Who can you believe?").

The chorus shows the protagonist's resolution to being fooled: stop listening to the schemer's persuasion, pay attention only if the schemer shows evidence, rather than being convinced by conniving words.

The second verse uses vivid imagery of a courtroom trial as the solution to the protagonist's; however, in this case, the deceived protagonist is the "judge and the jury".  After the second verse and chorus, an instrumental section features a bass solo by Geddy Lee and a shorter guitar solo by Alex Lifeson. The chorus in the last section uses more courtroom imagery and then alternates lines from the chorus between the two verses and the chorus using courtroom imagery.

Live performances
"Show, Don't Tell" was featured in the tour supporting Presto and was also included on the two subsequent tours, the Roll the Bones Tour and Counterparts Tour. It was then dropped from all future concerts. A live rendition of "Show, Don't Tell," recorded on Feb. 27, 1994 (the last year the band performed the song) at the Miami Arena, was included on the 1998 album Different Stages.

Track listing
Music by Lifeson, Peart, and Lee. Lyrics by Peart.

US release:
Show Don't Tell - 5:01

Canadian release:
Show Don't Tell (Edit) - 4:17
Red Tide - 4:29
Force Ten (live) - 4:50

See also
List of Rush songs
List of number-one mainstream rock hits (United States)

References

1989 singles
Rush (band) songs
Songs written by Geddy Lee
Songs written by Alex Lifeson
Songs written by Neil Peart
Atlantic Records singles
1989 songs
Rock ballads
Song recordings produced by Rupert Hine
1980s ballads